Bert M. Gretzinger (born April 7, 1951) is a Canadian curler. He was a member of the gold medal winning Canadian team at the 1994 World Men's Curling Championship. 

He also won a bronze medal at the 2001 Canadian Olympic Curling Trials, where he lost to Kerry Burtnyk in the semifinal 7-5.

He was known for his ability to make big shots which overcame his inconsistency to some extent.  He has played skip, third, and second at various points in his career.

Awards
British Columbia Sports Hall of Fame: inducted in 1995 with all of 1994 Rick Folk team, Canadian and World champions

Teams

References

External links

 Bert Gretzinger – Curling Canada Stats Archive
 
 
 Bert Gretzinger Gallery | Trading Card Database

Living people
Curlers from British Columbia
Canadian male curlers
World curling champions
Brier champions
1951 births